The Sutherland Trophy was created in 1958 by the British Film Institute as an annual award for "the maker of the most original and imaginative film introduced at the National Film Theatre during the year".

History
In 1997, the criteria changed to honour the maker of the most original and imaginative first feature screened during the London Film Festival.

The award is a sculpture in silver by Gerald Benney. It is presented on the closing night of the Festival. The award was named after the British Film Institute's patron, George Sutherland-Leveson-Gower, 5th Duke of Sutherland.

List of winners

See also
John Cassavetes Award
Independent film

References

External links
 British Film Institute

British film awards
British Film Institute
1958 establishments in the United Kingdom
Awards established in 1958

ca:Festival de Cinema de Londres#Trofeu Sutherland